Oceansat-1 or IRS-P4 was the first Indian satellite built primarily for ocean applications. It was a part of the Indian Remote Sensing Programme satellite series. The satellite carried an Ocean Colour Monitor (OCM) and a Multi-frequency Scanning Microwave Radiometer (MSMR) for oceanographic studies. Oceansat-1 thus vastly augment the IRS satellite system of Indian Space Research Organisation (ISRO) comprising four satellites, IRS-1B, IRS-1C, IRS-P3 and IRS-1D and extend remote sensing applications to several newer areas.

Launch 
Oceansat-1 was launched by the Indian Space Research Organisation's PSLV-C2 along with the DLR-Tubsat of Germany and Kitsat-3 of South Korea on 26 May 1999 from the Satish Dhawan Space Centre First Launch Pad of Satish Dhawan Space Centre in Sriharikota, India. It was the third successful launch of Polar Satellite Launch Vehicle (PSLV). It was the 8th satellite of the Indian Remote Sensing Programme (IRS) satellite series of India. Oceansat-1 was operated in a Sun-synchronous orbit.

Instruments 
Oceansat-1 carried two instruments:
 Multi-frequency Scanning Microwave Radiometer (MSMR), collects data by measuring microwave radiation passing through the atmosphere over the ocean. This offers information including sea surface temperature, wind speed, cloud water content, and water vapour content. MSMR monitor at 6.6 GHz.
 Ocean Colour Monitor (OCM), is a solid state camera literally designed primarily to monitor the colour of the ocean, thereby useful for documenting chlorophyll concentration, phytoplankton blooms, atmospheric aerosols and particulate matter. It is capable of detecting eight spectrums ranging from 400 nm to 885 nm, all in the visible or near infrared spectrums. OCM monitor globally potential fishery zones, ocean currents, and pollution and sediment inputs in the coastal zones. It operates on eight wavelength bands, providing data with a swath width of 1420 km and at a resolution of 350 metres.

Mission 
Although initially launched with a lifespan of 5 years, Oceansat-1 completed its mission on 8 August 2010, after serving for 11 years.

References

External links 
 Indian Space Research Organisation: IRS-P4

Earth observation satellites of India
ISRO satellites
Spacecraft launched in 1999
1999 in India
Oceanographic satellites